Po Leung Kuk Camões Tan Siu Lin Primary School is a primary school in Hong Kong, previously known as Portuguese Community Schools, Inc. (Escola Camões); demonym: Camõesian. The school is located at 6 Hoi Ting Road, Yau Ma Tei, Kowloon, Hong Kong. It has a multicultural environment with over 1,000 students from 18 different countries.

History
The school was established in the 1950s by the Portuguese Community Education and Welfare Foundation Incorporated. Since 1996, the school has been run by Po Leung Kuk. In the school year 1999, the school became a pioneer DSS primary school in Hong Kong. In the school year 2017–2018, Po Leung Kuk Camões Tan Siu Lin Primary School broke the Hong Kong record of Primary One application by having 8,100 applications.

Curriculum 
English is the main medium of instruction. Everything is taught in English other than the subjects of Chinese and Putonghua. Subjects include:

Despite having many students from foreign countries, all students are required to learn Chinese regardless of whether they speak the language.

Extra-curricular activities 
The school offers a variety of extracurricular activities, including:

 Music classes and school teams including Symphony Orchestra, Chinese Orchestra, School Choir, String Camerata, Handchime Ensembles and individual instruments
Sporting activities and school teams such as swimming, cricket, karate, taekwondo, table-tennis, basketball, Latin dance, badminton, football, volleyball, tennis, fencing, athletic training and triathlon
Visual arts - handicrafts, ceramics, Chinese painting, printmaking and watercolour painting
Accelerated and remedial classes for Chinese, English and Maths
Others - Camões TV team, Astronomy Club, Cubs and Brownies, Poem Recitation, French Drama, Cookery, Magic, Chinese Dance

Annual events 
Special events include the Annual Concert, Sports Day, Open Day, Chinese Week, English Week, 3rd Language Week(Japanese Week, French Week and Spanish Week), STEAM Week, and Christmas Party. At the latter, students wear traditional costumes. In year 2014–2015, there was a new event called the "Thanksgiving 360°".

School facilities 
The school has 30 classrooms in the main building and more than 30 new classrooms in the new annex for different learning use. Other facilities include:	
	
 Covered playgrounds (4)
 Open playground
 Reading corner
 Sport climbing room, sport climbing wall
 School hall
 Music rooms, piano rooms, drum rooms, rehearsal room, orchestra practice rooms
 Theatre (250+ seats)
 Common room
 Conference room
 Art rooms (2)
 Camões TV studio 
 Computer room
 MMLC (computer room)
 e-Learning centre
 Language Kingdom (for eg: English, French, Spanish, Japanese, Chinese,General Studies)
 Mini golf court
 Green podium
 Environmental resources centre
 Library
 Running track mat
 Organic garden
 Solar power plant 
 Tuck shop
 All-weather swimming pool

Self-publishing
 期待無限的可能 by Mr. Derek V. M. Yeung and Mr. CP Chan (June 2015) 
 園來自有機 by Camõesian Organic Garden (June 2016) 
 任何一天，任何一刻，也可以是新的開始⋯⋯ by Mr. CP CHAN and Ms Sanio Li (August 2020)

Achievements 
2014–2015
 66th Hong Kong Schools' Speech Festival
 Champion of English Choral Speaking (Senior)
 20 Champions in Solo Verse Speaking
 Outstanding Gold Group Award in True Light Girls' College - Primary School English Quest Competition
 全港十八區小學數學比賽 全場冠軍
2015–2016
 “Certified Organic Farm - Outstanding Management Award 2016” by Hong Kong Organic Resource Centre Certification Ltd.
2016–2017
 “Certified Organic Farm - Outstanding Management Award 2017” by Hong Kong Organic Resource Centre Certification Ltd.
2017–2018
 “Certified Organic Farm - Outstanding Management Award 2018” by Hong Kong Organic Resource Centre Certification Ltd.
2018–2019
 “Certified Organic Farm - Outstanding Management Award 2019” by Hong Kong Organic Resource Centre Certification Ltd.
 “2019 Think BIG of Learning 100” by Parenting.com.tw
2019–2020
 “Certified Organic Farm - Outstanding Management Award” by Hong Kong Organic Resource Centre Certification Ltd.
2020–2021
 “Certified Organic Farm - Outstanding Management Award” by Hong Kong Organic Resource Centre Certification Ltd.
2021–2022
 “Certified Organic Farm - Outstanding Management Award” by Hong Kong Organic Resource Centre Certification Ltd.

References

External links
 

Primary schools in Hong Kong
Direct Subsidy Scheme schools
Po Leung Kuk